The  is a diesel multiple unit train type operated by Japanese National Railways and then later operated by JR Hokkaido, JR West, and JR East between 1985 and 2010, and by the Philippine National Railways (PNR) on the Metro South Commuter and Isarog Express lines since 2012. It is a reconditioned diesel train remodeled from aging JNR-Era rolling stocks converted from KiHa 56, 28 & 58 units for conversion into chartered-type trains across Japan.

History

JR Hokkaido

In December 1985, KiHa 59 was remodeled from KiHa 26 and KiHa 56 cars at the Naebo plant in Sapporo, Japan. It was the last resort train to be introduced by the Japanese National Railways which was privatized to be separated and destined to JR Hokkaido in Hokkaido region. The train was initially called "Alpha Continental Express" and started operating on the Ishikatsu Line as a chartered tourist train. It attracted widespread attention due to its design and facilities, and was operated as a group chartered train, and been offered temporary limited express trains all over the country against the backdrop of the resort boom before and after the era.

The Alpha Continental Express was nicknamed as "Alcon" which they only used when contracted transportation with both Tomamu and Sahoro resorts, and they also offer other services used such as "Resort Express", "Peppermint Express", and "JTB Panorama Express".

Although it was popular during that time, they also encountered different problems which became apparent when the newer rolling stocks introduced. The maximum speed was limited to 95 km/h, which made it difficult to adapt to the timetables of newer JR Hokkaido express trains, which they are struggled to perform on the lines to be arrived and depart on-time.

It has been used for nearly 10 years since the conversion and nearly 30 years since being manufactured in the 1960s. It was withdrawn in 1995.

Formations
The Alpha Continental Express trainset was formed as follows (1985 – 1995). They also offered in different train services in Hokkaido region such as "Resort Express", "Peppermint Express", but not "JTB Panorama Express" which they add one carriage in 1986, resulting in a four-car formation.

They also operated the special train service called "JTB Panorama Express" trainset which was formed as follows (1986-1995).

JR East

The three-car train was converted in November 1989 at JR East's Koriyama Works from former KiHa 58 and KiHa 28 diesel cars to become the KiHa 59 series Gracia Joyful Train set for use on special charter services in the Sendai area and north east of Japan. The train was withdrawn in May 2003 and rebuilt to become the Kogane trainset, repainted in a white, gold, and orange livery and re-entering service from July 2003.

The Kogane trainset was withdrawn from service on 26 December 2010, and was subsequently shipped to the Philippines.

Formations
The Gracia trainset was formed as follows (1989 to May 2003).

The Kogane trainset was formed as follows (July 2003 - December 2010).

JR West

JR West introduced their "VIVA West"  Joyful Train service in 1989.

It was formed at JR West Hiroshima works after "Resort Saloon Fiesta" train services in 1989 by remodeling former KiHa 28 and 58 series cars. The remodeling work was carried out at the Habu rolling stock plant (now the Shimonoseki General Rolling Stock Office).

It was also temporarily used as a passenger train for short train services, and ended operation after nearly ten years and was scrapped in March 1999.

Formations
The Viva West trainset was formed as follows (1989 – 1999).

Operations in the Philippine National Railways

In its operations under the Philippine National Railways, it served as an intercity train and premiere train, but its windshields had to be armored with steel mesh to prevent the glass from being pelted by train stoners. The unit underwent general renovation and overhaul in 2019. The armoring was later removed when the livery was updated to match the newly arrived PT-INKA livery, along with the updating of the windshields into more durable polycarbonate panels.

On 20 September 2019, the PNR Kogane trainset was used on test run and clearing operations on the Calamba-Los Baños section of the PNR Metro Commuter Line. Kogane also went to Legazpi for the inspection of the PNR South Main Line together with 917 prior to the PNR South Long Haul project.

Formations 
The Kogane trainset in service with Philippine National Railways is formed as follows.

Incidents 
 In February 2020, a window in the Kogane trainset shattered due to a stoning incident.

Gallery

References

Philippine National Railways
Rolling stock of the Philippines
59
East Japan Railway Company